A fecal pH test is one where a specimen of feces is tested for acidity in order to diagnose a medical condition. The pH of human feces is variable but usually alkaline. An acidic stool can indicate a digestive problem such as lactose intolerance, an infection such as E. coli or rotavirus, or overgrowth of acid-producing bacteria (such as lactic acid bacteria).

The average pH for a healthy person is 6.6.{{cite web|title=010991: pH, Stool|url=https://healthmatters.io/understand-blood-test-results/stool-ph

Test procedure 
The test is fast and can be performed in a doctor's office. A patient must not be receiving antibiotics. At least half a milliliter of feces is collected, and a strip of nitrazine paper is dipped in the sample and compared against a color scale. A pH of less than 5.5 indicates an acidic sample.

Results
Unhealthy individuals with a higher or lower pH rate have been observed having a higher mortality rate. A high alkaline pH rating is associated with the body's inability to create enough acid along with undigested food.

References

See also 
 Stool test

Stool tests